George Herman Middelkamp (April 20, 1880 – October 5, 1966) was an American politician who served as the State Treasurer of Missouri as a Democrat.

Life

On April 20, 1880, George Herman Middelkamp was born to John Herman Middelkamp and Mary Otillie Gerdemann in Warrenton, Missouri. On November 30, 1904, he married Clara M. Ordelheide and later had two children with her. In 1906, a bank in Hawk Point was created and Middlekamp served as its cashier until 1916. In the 1910s he entered politics and became a member of the Democratic state committee from the Ninth congressional district.

In 1916, he received the Democratic nomination for state treasurer and resigned from his position as cashier after winning in the general election. He later received the Democratic nomination for State Auditor of Missouri in 1920 and 1924, but was defeated in the general election both times.

On October 5, 1966, he died in St. Louis, Missouri.

Electoral history

References

1880 births
1966 deaths
20th-century American politicians
Missouri Democrats
State treasurers of Missouri
People from Warrenton, Missouri